Michael Byers is a Canadian legal scholar and non-fiction author.

Academic background
Byers was educated at the University of Saskatchewan, where he received his BA (honours) with majors in English literature and political studies. He then studied law at McGill University, achieving his LLB and BCL degrees in 1992. He completed his studies at University of Cambridge, where he received his PhD in international law. Before becoming a professor of political science at University of British Columbia in 2004, he was a research fellow from 1996 until 1999 at University of Oxford, and from 1999 until 2004, he was a professor of law and the director of Canadian Studies at Duke University.

Since 2004, he has held the Canada Research Chair in Global Politics and International Law at the University of British Columbia in Vancouver, British Columbia. From 2017 to 2019, he was concurrently appointed to the Brenda and David McLean Chair in Canadian Studies at UBC. Byers has also taught as a visiting professor at the universities of Tel Aviv, Cape Town, Nord (Norway) and Novosibirsk (Russia).

Political engagement
In February 2004, as Director of Duke University's Center for Canadian Studies, Byers hosted Jack Layton in Durham, North Carolina. Later, after Byers’ return to Canada, he began to advise Layton on Canadian defence and foreign policy, most notably with regards to Canada's role in the war in Afghanistan.

On July 2, 2008, Byers announced that he was seeking the New Democratic Party nomination for the federal riding of Vancouver Centre, a seat held by Liberal Party of Canada incumbent Hedy Fry since 1993, in the next Canadian federal election. Byers had not previously sought elected office and the Liberal Party had tried to attract him as a candidate, with Liberal leader Stéphane Dion inviting him for a beer in spring 2008.

Byers received much attention because he was considered by many to be a "star" candidate for the NDP.

During the campaign, Byers was sharply critical of the Harper government's supposed militarization of the Arctic; he also advocated a negotiation with the Taliban in Afghanistan. At a candidates' debate at the end of September 2008, Byers made the controversial statement that the Alberta tar sands needed to be shut down "to address the global climate crisis". The Liberal and Green candidates claimed that this position contradicted the official NDP platform, while Byers believed that it was covered by already passed legislation calling on Canada to reduce carbon dioxide emissions by 80 per cent by 2050.

After the national NDP campaign faltered, Fry won reelection with 19,423 votes (34.4% of the popular vote). Byers ran third, with 12,043 votes (21.3%).

In 2010, Byers advised Foreign Minister Lawrence Cannon on Canada's Arctic Foreign Policy Statement. In May 2017, Cannon announced that he would be starting a PhD under Byers' supervision at UBC.

After Jack Layton's death in August 2011, Byers supported Tom Mulcair's successful campaign for the leadership of the federal NDP.

Writing and advocacy
His books include Custom, Power and the Power of Rules (Cambridge University Press 1999), The Role of Law in International Politics (Oxford University Press 2000), US Hegemony and the Foundations of International Law (Cambridge University Press 2003), War Law (Atlantic Books and, in Canada, Douglas & McIntyre, 2005), and Intent for a Nation: What Is Canada For? (Douglas & McIntyre 2007) (playing against George Grant's Lament for a Nation). In 2009, he wrote Who Owns the Arctic? (Douglas & McIntyre 2009), which was shorted for the Donner Prize for the best Canadian book on public policy. Four years later, his International Law and the Arctic (Cambridge University Press 2013) won the Donner Prize.

Byers is a regular commentator on CBC on programs such as The Current and The National, and a frequent contributor to The Globe and Mail, National Post, and Toronto Star. His articles have also been published in international newspapers, including the Washington Post, Wall Street Journal, Times of London, Independent on Sunday, The Guardian, and London Review of Books.

His political positions include the following:

Liberal–NDP coalition
In November 2009, Byers suggested that the Liberal Party of Canada and the New Democratic Party (NDP) "should agree to not run candidates against each other in the next campaign" in electoral ridings in order to prevent the Conservative Party of Canada from forming another minority government. However, critics pointed out that his reasoning is based on the assumption that Liberal voters who are denied the ability to vote for a Liberal candidate would automatically vote for a NDP candidate, and that many might instead vote for the Conservatives (or simply not vote at all). NDP MP Nathan Cullen argued the same in his 2011–12 campaign for the federal NDP leadership.

Lockheed Martin F-35 Lightning II purchase
Byers was a vocal opponent of the Harper government's proposed purchase of Lockheed Martin F-35 Lightning II fighter jets.

In July 2010, he wrote: 

In June 2014, he returned to the subject, comparing the 1960-era Lockheed CF-104 Starfighter and the F-35 Lightning. Both single engine planes are strike aircraft as opposed to air-superiority fighters and are poorly suited for dog-fighting. The single engine makes both vulnerable to failure: 110 of the 239 CF-104 Starfighters  crashed before they were replaced by the CF-18s; one quarter of those crashes were attributed to bird strikes. Furthermore, the F-35 Lightning will be equipped with 24 million lines of computer code, making it vulnerable to  EMP warfare.

Arctic sovereignty
Byers has written extensively on issues of Arctic sovereignty.

In 2007 Byers was critical of the Harper government's change of plans for building new ice-strengthened patrol ships. The previous year, the Harper government had announced plans to build three heavy-duty icebreakers, but in 2007, the Harper government revised the plan to build six to eight dual use vessels, which would only be capable of operations in one metre of first-year sea ice.

Byers agreed with a 2010 report prepared for the Senate of Canada that Canadian Coast Guard vessels patrolling the Arctic should be armed, stating, the "quiet authority of a deck-mounted gun" is not a provocation.

On December 28, 2011, the Toronto Star published an article by Byers entitled "Russia pulling ahead in the Arctic". In that article he noted that Canada and Russia have taken identical positions as to whether they exercise sovereignty over the Northwest Passage and Northern Sea Route. Byers also quoted a previously secret US diplomatic cable, released by WikiLeaks, that reported that Prime Minister of Canada Stephen Harper believed that relations with Russia in the Arctic were good and would not lead to war.

Also on December 28, 2011, Al Jazeera published an article by Byers entitled "The dragon looks north", about China's recent exploration efforts in the Arctic. He suggested China didn't need to challenge the sovereignty of coastal countries in the Arctic because those countries were open to foreign investment and trade and saw the benefits of Chinese capital and Chinese markets.

In 2017, Byers published an article in the journal International Relations entitled "Crises and International Cooperation: An Arctic Case Study".

Pinochet case
Byers was involved in the 1998–1999 extradition case concerning former Chilean military ruler Augusto Pinochet in the British House of Lords, working with Ian Brownlie QC and members of a legal team representing Amnesty International and other human rights organizations. One of Byers' roles was to speak with the British and international media. He also wrote about the Pinochet case in the Times of London, the London Review of Books, the British Yearbook of International Law, and the Duke Journal of Comparative and International Law.

Afghan detainees
Byers has been involved in the issue of Afghan detainees since January 2002, when he wrote the first widely read op-ed article about Guantanamo Bay detention camp, which was published in The Guardian newspaper. In September 2005, Byers wrote an article in The Globe and Mail newspaper questioning the legality of Canadian troops transferring Afghan detainees to US custody. When Canada and Afghanistan entered into a transfer agreement three months later, Byers questioned the legality of that agreement, and detainee transfers made under it, before Parliamentary committees, in a press conference with Amir Attaran, and through two open letters to the Prosecutor of the International Criminal Court co-authored with William Schabas. In June 2016, Byers and Schabas called on the new Canadian government to open war crimes investigations.

Climate change
Byers served as principal investigator of the Climate Justice Project, a SSHRC-funded Community-University Research Alliance between the University of British Columbia and the British Columbia office of the Canadian Centre for Policy Alternatives. The $1.6 million project examined the nexus between climate change policy and social justice, with British Columbia serving as a case study for these issues of global consequence.

In 2017, Byers co-authored a lengthy article on "The Internationalization of Climate Damages Litigation”  in the Washington Journal of Environmental Law and Policy.

Outer space
Byers began working on space issues in 2007 when Canada's largest space company, MacDonald, Dettwiler and Associates (MDA), now a part of Maxar Technologies, wished to sell itself to a US arms manufacturer. MDA is a world leader in synthetic aperture radar satellites such as Radarsat-2, which can produce high resolution images at night and through clouds. Byers appeared before Parliamentary committees and wrote articles in the Globe and Mail and (together with Scott Brison) in the National Post. The Harper government ultimately blocked the sale, based on the importance of the satellites for Arctic security.

Byers has written a number of op-ed articles on space issues, including a piece in the Washington Post entitled "Elon Musk, President of Mars?" and pieces in the Globe and Mail on space debris and  asteroid mining. In 2017, Byers and his teenage son Cameron published an article in the journal Polar Record entitled "Toxic Splash: Russian rocket stages dropped in Arctic waters raise health, environmental and legal concerns".

Salt Spring Forum
Byers serves as chair of the Board of the Salt Spring Forum, a charitable organization that organizes an annual speakers’ series on Salt Spring Island, BC. Past guests include Noam Chomsky, Louise Arbour, Conrad Black, Andrew Coyne, Amy Goodman, Chantal Hebert, Naomi Klein, Bill McKibben and David Suzuki.

References

External links
"Celebration for a Nation", Ottawa Citizen article by Michael Byers, June 2007
Michael Byers at the University of British Columbia faculty page
'Michael Byers on the Arctic' – weblog

Year of birth missing (living people)
Living people
Canadian non-fiction writers
New Democratic Party candidates for the Canadian House of Commons
Canada Research Chairs
Academic staff of the University of British Columbia
McGill University Faculty of Law alumni